Dhamial Airbase or Qasim Airbase  is a Pakistan Army airbase located in southern Rawalpindi, Pakistan. It is the headquarters of Pakistan Army Aviation.

It was built a few kilometers outside Rawalpindi city, but due to the expansion of the city, it is now surrounded by major colonies, including Askari IIIX. It is frequently used by small aircraft and helicopters. Dhamial Airbase is also used for overhauling helicopters, including Mil Mi 17, Bell 412 and Bell AH-1F Cobra.

References

External links

Pakistan Army airbases
Military installations in Punjab, Pakistan